The Independence Arch in Accra, Ghana, is part of the Independence Square which contains monuments to Ghana's independence struggle, including the Independence Arch, Black Star Gate, and the Liberation Day Monument.

About the Arch 

As of 2011, the Independence Arch is guarded by several soldiers who prohibit people of taking close up pictures of the Arch and asking visitors for official permission, but you are free to take pictures of the area.

References

External links

 See pictures of the "Independence Arch" - photograph from the top of the "Black Star Gate"
 A video of the Arch and Square can be found here.

Buildings and structures in Accra
Triumphal arches
Monuments and memorials in Ghana
Government buildings in Ghana